Elk Plain is a census-designated place (CDP) in Pierce County, Washington, United States. The population was 14,534 at the 2020 census.

Geography
Elk Plain is located at  (47.044812, -122.366812).

According to the United States Census Bureau, the CDP has a total area of 9.6 square miles (24.8 km2), all of it land.

Demographics

2000 census
As of the census of 2000, there were 15,697 people, 4,990 households, and 4,166 families residing in the CDP. The population density was 1,640.8 people per square mile (633.3/km2). There were 5,211 housing units at an average density of 544.7/sq mi (210.2/km2). The racial makeup of the CDP was 80.57% White, 5.40% African American, 1.23% Native American, 4.05% Asian, 1.37% Pacific Islander, 1.48% from other races, and 5.89% from two or more races. Hispanic or Latino of any race were 4.73% of the population.

There were 4,990 households, out of which 48.8% had children under the age of 18 living with them, 66.9% were married couples living together, 10.5% had a female householder with no husband present, and 16.5% were non-families. 12.1% of all households were made up of individuals, and 2.6% had someone living alone who was 65 years of age or older. The average household size was 3.12 and the average family size was 3.34.

In the CDP, the population was spread out, with 32.9% under the age of 18, 7.7% from 18 to 24, 34.0% from 25 to 44, 20.0% from 45 to 64, and 5.4% who were 65 years of age or older. The median age was 32 years. For every 100 females, there were 101.9 males. For every 100 females age 18 and over, there were 101.3 males.

The median income for a household in the CDP was $54,400, and the median income for a family was $57,004. Males had a median income of $39,242 versus $26,105 for females. The per capita income for the CDP was $19,547. About 5.5% of families and 7.8% of the population were below the poverty line, including 10.1% of those under age 18 and 0.4% of those age 65 or over.

Education
Public schools in Elk Plain are part of the Bethel School District. Schools in or near Elk Plain include:

 Elementary Schools:
 Elk Plain School of Choice Elementary School
 Centennial Elementary School
 Shining Mountain Elementary School
 Junior High School:
 Bethel Junior High School
 High School:
 Bethel High School
 Private school:
 Bethel Baptist Christian School (grades K4-12)
 Nearby colleges:
 Pacific Lutheran University (Parkland)
 Colleges in Tacoma
 Colleges in Lakewood
 Colleges in Puyallup
 Colleges offering classes at Joint Base Lewis-McChord''

References

Census-designated places in Pierce County, Washington
Census-designated places in Washington (state)